The water polo competition at the 2000 Summer Olympics in Sydney, Australia saw Hungary’s return to the gold medal platform and the introduction of the women’s tournament. The Australian women had lobbied the IOC hard for the inclusion of women’s water polo in the Olympics, including showing up at the airport dressed only in their swimsuits during one pre-Olympic visit by members of the IOC.

Six nations competed in the women’s tournament with home team Australia winning the gold medal over the United States. Twelve nations competed in the men’s tournament and played a total of 48 matches. Spain was unable to follow up their 1996 gold medal performance with a medal. Hungary defeated Russia for the gold medal. The matches were held at Ryde Aquatic Leisure Centre and the Sydney Olympic Aquatic Centre.

Qualification

Men

Women

Medal summary

Medal table

Medalists

References

Sources
 PDF documents in the LA84 Foundation Digital Library:
 Official Results Book – 2000 Olympic Games – Water Polo (download, archive)
 Water polo on the Olympedia website
 Water polo at the 2000 Summer Olympics (men's tournament, women's tournament)
 Water polo on the Sports Reference website
 Water polo at the 2000 Summer Games (men's tournament, women's tournament) (archived)

External links
Official Olympic Report

 
O
2000 Summer Olympics events
2000
2000